There were several independent candidates in the 1980 Canadian federal election, none of whom were elected.

Ontario

Milorad Novich (Broadview—Greenwood)

Novich was a civil engineering technician.  He said that he wanted to end "the government's financial support of international communism", and promoted Canadian unity and better housing. He was 42 years old in 1979.

References